Elif Keskin (born 12 January 2002) is a  Turkish women's football midfielder , who plays in the Turkish Women's Super League for Fatih Karagümrük S.K. with jersey number 55. She played for the Turkey national U-17 and Turkey U-19 teams before she became a member of the Turkey team.

Club career 

Elif Keskinobtained her license from Beşiktaş J.K. on 30 May 2014. She debuted for  her team in the Turkish Women's First League match on 5 February 2017. In the 2018–19 Women's First League season, she enjoyed her team'league champion title.

She was part of the 2018–19 Women's First League champion team Beşiktaş J.K. at the |2019–20 UEFA Women's Champions League – Group 9 matches. She scored one goal against the Dutch  FC Twente Vrouwen.  Following her team's champion title in the 2020–21 Turkcell League season, she played in two matches of the 2021–22 UEFA Women's Champions League qualifying rounds.
In the 2022–23 Super League, she transferred to Fatih Karagümrük S.K.

International career 
Keskin was admitted to the Turkey women's national under-15 team, and debuted in the friendly match against Moldova on 7 April 2016. She capped in two matches for the Turkey U-15 team.

She became then a member of the Turkey U-17 team in the friendly match against Russia on 25 January 2017. She took part at the 2018 UEFA Women's Under-17 Championship qualification – Group 7 and 2018 UEFA qualification – Elite Round Group 6 matches in addition to the UEFA Development Tournaments in 2017 and 2018. She capped 27 times in total, and scored three goals.

On 27 February 2019, she debuted for the Turkey U-19 team in the friendly match against Belgium U*19 team. She took part at the 2019 UEFA Women's Under-19 Championship qualification – Elite round Group 6 and matches.

Career statistics 
.

Honours 
Turkish Women's First League
Beşiktaş J.K.
 Winners (2): 2018–19, 2020–21
 Runners-up (2): 2016–17, 2017–18

References

External links

Living people
2002 births
People from Gaziosmanpaşa
Footballers from Istanbul
Turkish women's footballers
Women's association football midfielders
Beşiktaş J.K. women's football players
Turkish Women's Football Super League players
Fatih Karagümrük S.K. (women's football) players